Altensteig (Swabian: Aldaschdaeg) is a town in the district of Calw, in Baden-Württemberg, Germany.

History

Altensteig was most likely given town rights by the Counts of Hohenberg around the middle of the 14th century. In 1398, the town became a possession of the Margraviate of Baden and then of the Duchy of Württemberg in 1603. That district, too, was dissolved in 1938 and Altensteig was assigned to the newly-organized Landkreis Calw.

Geography
The city (Stadt) of Simmersfeld is located at the south-western edge of the district of Calw, in the German state of Baden-Württemberg. It lies along the border with the district of Freudenstadt to the south and west. Elevation above sea level in the municipal area ranges from a high of  Normalnull (NN) to a low of  NN.

Politics
Altensteig has nine boroughs: Altensteig, Altensteigdorf, Berneck, Garrweiler, Hornberg, Spielberg, Überberg, Walddorg, Wart. There are also 15 villages in the municipal area: Bahnhof Berneck, Baiermühle, Bruderhaus, Chausseehaus, Elektrizitätswerk, Fischhaus, Heselbronn, Internationales Forum Burg Hornberg, Kohlsägmühle, Lengenloch, Lohmühle, Monhardt, Trögelsbach, Ziegelhütte, Zumweiler.

Coat of arms
The municipal coat of arms of Altensteig shows a castle in red and white, upon a field of yellow and below a black , atop a green mountain approached by a yellow road. This coat of arms first appeared on a town seal in 1604, and was modified in 1935 with the addition of the stag antler to reference Württemberg. The winding path refers to the German word Steige, or "path", and to the name Altensteig.

Transportation
Altensteig is connected to Germany's network of roadways by Bundesstraße 28.

References

External links

  (in German)

 
Towns in Baden-Württemberg
Calw (district)
Württemberg